USCGC Alex Haley (WMEC-39) is a United States Coast Guard Cutter and former United States Navy vessel that was recommissioned for Coast Guard duty on 10 July 1999. In 1995, Edenton won the Marjorie Sterrett Battleship Fund Award for the Atlantic Fleet.

The conversion from a salvage ship to a Coast Guard cutter involved the removal of the stern towing machine, forward crane, and A-frame, and the installation of a flight deck, retractable hangar, and air-search radar.  Additionally, her four aging Paxman diesel engines were replaced with four 16-cylinder Caterpillar diesels.

The cutter was named after author and journalist Alex Haley, the first chief journalist of the Coast Guard, the first African-American to reach the rank of chief petty officer, and the Pulitzer Prize-winning author of Roots: The Saga of an American Family.  Haley served in the Coast Guard for 20 years.

The vessel's current home port is Kodiak, Alaska at the Coast Guard Base Kodiak from where she carries out her Fishery Law Enforcement and Search and Rescue primary missions.

In fiction
In the 2007 novel Robert Ludlum's The Arctic Event by James H. Cobb, Alex Haley is the ship that takes the heroes out to the island where a Tu-4 laden with anthrax crashed during the Cold War.

Photos

References

Notes

Sources
 USCGC Alex Haley

External links

 
 

 

Edenton-class salvage and rescue ships
Ships built in Lowestoft
1968 ships
Medium endurance cutters